Liu Yuning (born 8 January 1990) is a Chinese chef, singer, actor, and the lead singer of Modern Brothers. In 2018, Liu rose to stardom by his covers on YY's Live Streaming and Douyin platforms, and released his debut single "Imagination" in September 15, 2018. He released his debut studio Album "Ten" in 2019, and held his first concert tour "Growing Storm" in 2020. Forbes China listed Liu on their 30 Under 30 Asia 2019 list which consisted of 30 influential People under 30 years old who have had a substantial effect in their fields. His debut Album "Ten" won the "Media Recommended Album" award in 2020 Chinese Top Ten Music Awards, and his second EP "Listen Ning" (2020–21) won the "Most Popular EP" award in 2021 Chinese Top Ten Music Awards. Besides singing, he also gains recognition for his roles in TV series.

Early life 
Liu Yuning was born in Dandong, Liaoning Province. He grew up with his grandparents after his father passed away when he was 4 years old, while his mother had to go to work everyday and eventually remarried then live with her new family. He likes to sing since he was a child and wanted to learn more, but his family condition couldn't afford him to take lessons or formal music education.

Liu graduated from Dandong Vocational-Technical Secondary School where he was professionally trained as a cook. He chose culinary program because he needed a skill to survive and had an impression that being a cook could save him from starvation. Prior to his debut, he did different kind of jobs such as passing out flyers, chef, waiter, and clothing salesman. As he didn't want to give up his initial dream, he bought a guitar with his first small salary and was willing to sing at local bars even though sometimes he didn't get paid. He later formed the rock band 'Modern Brothers' with his best friends.

Career

Pre-2018

In 2010, Liu took part in Hunan Television's Super Boy, but was eliminated in the audition stage and failed to advance.

In 2014, Liu formed Modern Brothers band with A Zhuo and Da Fei, and joined the YY's live streaming platform in March 2015 where they covered dozens of songs.  

In 2016, he made his debut as an actor in the movie Class 952.  

In 2017 he moved his band's live streaming stage from indoors to outdoors, to a historical street market in his hometown, Dandong.

2018

Liu Yuning and the Modern Brothers band had a phenomenal rise to stardom after 4 years of live-streaming (singing) on the YY platform. It was after his posting of short singing videos on Douyin in June 2018 which resulted to Liu gaining more fans for his unique guttural singing voice. He and his band were invited to various television shows to perform. In July and August 2018, Liu was invited to a number of television shows includes Hunan Television's Day Day Up and CCTV3's Setting Out for Happiness, but his first professional music stage performance was Jiangsu Television's Finding Gold Song. He was also invited to perform at festival galas. On October 19, he attended Zhejiang Television's Autumn Gala with his Modern Brothers band. In November, he participated in Jiangsu Television's Mask Singer. On Dec 31, he attended Jiangsu Television's 2019 New Year Concert.

Liu Yuning also sang OSTs for various films and TV series that year. On July 30, he released "Toast the wine" (让酒) for Tomb of the sea (沙海). On September 12, Liu sang the theme song for Jia Zhangke's film Ash Is Purest White.

On August 17, 2018,  Liu and his Modern Brothers band held their first offline singing club event at the exhibition center of Guangzhou Central Station.

On September 15, Liu released his first solo single "Imagine".

2019–present

In January 2019, Liu Yuning was voted the "National recommended singer" to be a contestant as the challenger singer in Hunan Television's singing competition Singer 2019.

On March 25, 2019, Liu won the Best New Artist and the Internet Influence Honor awards at the Chinese Top Ten Music Awards. His "Toast the Wine" was also awarded the Media Recommended OST. In March 2019, Liu participated as regular member in Hunan TV's variety show Our Brilliant Masters.

In October 2019, Liu participated as a regular member in Shanghai TV's music show Our song 2019. As one of the eight young singers, he teamed up with older generation singer Richie Jen. 

Liu and Modern Brothers also held their first concert tour in 5 cities from August to November 2019 (the last stop, planned to be held on February 14, 2020 in Wuhan, was postponed due to the COVID-19 pandemic).

Liu released dozens of singles and OSTs, including the theme song (Chinese version) for anime film Penguin Highway.

In December 2019, Liu released his first solo studio album "Ten" (十).

He continues his high productivity in 2020 and multiple singles, EPs, and OSTs were released. His song "An Island" (一座岛), the 4th song for his first EP "Promise" (如约) was released on May 21, 2020. Other singles included "Stay up Late“ (熬夜) and "Flying on Paper" (纸上飞行), the second collaboration with CORSAK (胡梦周). From November to early December 2020, the trilogy "Loyal Audience" (忠实观众), " Hope You Are Well" (别来无恙) and "Handwritten Fairy Tale" (手写童话) for his second EP "Listen∙Ning" was released. Notable OSTs include theme song "Heroes in Harm's Way" for the first chapter of Heroes in Harm's Way, theme song "Love and Redemption" for the TV series Love and Redemption, and trailer song "A Good Guy" (挺好个人呐) for the movie My people, My Homeland.

In July 2020, Liu brought his new single "Talking about Love" (你说爱情啊) to the stage of Chinese Top Ten Music Awards, and he also won the All-rounded Artist of the Year award, the People's Choice Singer Award, and the Media Recommended Album for his first studio album "Ten" (十).

In 2021, Liu has released more than 30 OSTs for various TV series, movies, documentaries, and video games, including "Heavenly Questions" (天问) for the popular TV series Word of Honor, which won 3 consecutive top hits in Uni Music chart. In March 21, "Magical Surprise" (奇妙的惊喜), the new theme song Liu sang for the 5th anniversary of Shanghai Disneyland was released. Liu is the first Chinese pop singer to sing a Chinese theme song for Disney. Liu also sang the character song for Wei Wuxian in the Anime series Mo Dao Zu Shi.

In October 2021, Liu returned as a regular member in Shanghai TV's music show Our Song 2021. He teamed up with Penny Tai.

In November 2021, Liu again won the All-rounded Artist of the Year award, the Internet Influential Male Singer award, and the Most Popular EP award for his second EP "Listen∙Ning" at the Chinese Top Ten Music Awards.

In January 1 of 2022, "Fall in Love", the first song of his second Studio Album, was released. In summer of 2022, the theme song "Looking for you" for popular TV series "Love Between Fairy and Devil" won him 4 consecutive champions in TenCent Music Billboard.

Besides his music career, he starred in several low budget movies. But he gains growing recognition for acting through dramas. His popular roles include "Dark Glasses" in TV series "Ultimate Notes", Hao Du in "the Long Ballad", and Bai Choufei in "Heroes". In addition, he dubs his own characters in costume dramas that he stars in. 

As for now, he still does live streaming on Weibo that can last 2~5 hours to sing and talk with his fans even when he's busy with songs recording and drama filming. He mostly does live performances without his band members too as they're focusing on family business, but the group hasn't disbanded and they're still close to each other, hence he still introduces himself as Modern Brother's Liu Yuning in every opportunity.

Discography

Album

Extended plays

Singles

Original Soundtrack (OSTs)

Filmography

Film

Television series

Animation

Variety Show

Concert tours

2019 Modern Brothers Concert Tour "Growing Storm"

Awards and Nominations

Music

Film and Television

Miscellaneous

Note

References

External links
 

1990 births
Living people
Chinese male singers
Chinese male film actors
People from Dandong
Male actors from Liaoning
Singers from Liaoning